Andaman and Nicobar Islands Forest and Plantation Development Corporation Limited, or ANIFPDCL (1977-2017), was a Public Sector Undertaking of the Government of India on the Andaman and Nicobar Islands.  The corporation provided and managed forestry resources in the union territories of Andaman and Nicobar in India.

History
The government-owned company was established in 1977. It was headquartered in Port Blair. The economy of these islands was considered dependent on the development of tropical rain forests-based industries.

ANIFPDCL was primarily involved in the harvest and regeneration of forests. Logging was based on sustained yield principles, and minimizing disturbances to the island rain forest ecosystem and using a natural regeneration technique known as the Andaman Canopy Lifting Shelterwood System.

It also managed red oil palm and rubber plantations on the islands.

Since 2001 the ANIFPDCL was an overall loss making company. That resulted in its not being able to pay salary and wages to its employees.

In August 2017, the Indian Cabinet gave final approval to the Indian Ministry of Environment and Forests to close the Andaman and Nicobar Islands Forest and Plantation Development Corporation.

See also

References

Forest products companies
Defunct companies of India
Forest administration in India
Government-owned companies of India
Forest and Plantation Development Corporation
Ministry of Environment, Forest and Climate Change
Forest and Plantation Development Corporation
Indian companies established in 1977
Indian companies disestablished in 2017
Renewable resource companies established in 1977
Renewable resource companies disestablished in 2017
1977 establishments in the Andaman and Nicobar Islands